Adrian Kelvin Borland (6 December 1957 – 26 April 1999) was an English singer, songwriter, guitarist and record producer, best known as the frontman of post-punk band the Sound.

Following a substantial musical career spanning numerous groups, as well as a solo career, he succumbed to symptoms of schizoaffective disorder, and committed suicide by jumping in front of a train on 26 April 1999.

Early career
Adrian Kelvin Borland was born in the Hampstead area of London, the son of Bob Borland, a physicist at the National Physical Laboratory, and Win, an English teacher.

At primary school the young Borland was already friends with future Sound bassist (and Second Layer collaborator) 
Graham "Green" Bailey, and would meet Stephen Budd, closely involved with his band the Sound in their early years, in his early teens. Budd would later recall, "We met when we were both 14. He was the only other kid I knew with an electric guitar. Even at 14 you could see he was a genius". Borland played guitar left-handed.

Borland's first band, the Wimbledon-based punk rock trio the Outsiders, was formed with Borland at its nucleus, manning vocals and guitar. Bob Lawrence was on bass, and Adrian 'Jan' Janes manned the drums. Their debut LP, Calling on Youth, was self-released on their Raw Edge label, and became the first UK self-released punk album. and won them their first unfavourable reviews: "apple-cheeked Ade has a complexion that would turn a Devon milkmaid green with envy", reported the NME.

A single released that November, One to Infinity, was labelled as "tuneless, gormless, gutless" (again by the NME), but was praised elsewhere. It was followed by a second album, Close Up in 1978. This received better reviews from the press. During his time with the Outsiders he played on stage with Iggy Pop.

It was after this album that important changes took place that would decide the band's future: Lawrence left to be replaced by Borland's old friend Graham 'Green' Bailey, and Adrian Janes' departure to go to college allowed Geoffrey Cummant-Wood (the band's manager) to suggest 28-year-old Mike Dudley in his stead. The Outsiders trio then became the Sound, a quartet, with the arrival of Bi Marshall (real name Benita Biltoo), an acquaintance of Bailey's and the band from around 1977. The new sound was augmented by her use of the clarinet (later saxophone) and synthesizer.

The Sound: 1979–1988

Borland became the kernel of the Sound, being the songwriter, main vocalist and guitarist, penning tracks for the early Propaganda sessions and the Jeopardy recordings (their debut album release, originally recorded by Budd for his Tortch label which had put out the band’s first release, the Physical World EP. The album was subsequently released on Warner's Korova label and Budd became the Sound’s early manager). From this point on Borland became critically acclaimed, if never a household name.

The Sound's second album, From the Lions Mouth, was even more enthusiastically received, selling over 100,000 units worldwide. Borland's personal productivity was enhanced even more with two collaborations that year, one with Jello Biafra in the Witch Trials, and another with Sound bassist Graham Bailey in Second Layer, which spawned the electronic album World of Rubber. The Sound were caught on a downcurve, however, the following year with the release of All Fall Down (1982), an experimental and bitter album that represented the band's refusal to make more commercial music to satisfy their label (Korova, a Warner Bros. subsidiary). Korova responded by dropping them, while the music press rapidly disowned them; a Sounds review called the album "virtually worthless".

The Sound never recovered from this setback, although they did release a mini album, Shock of Daylight, a live album In the Hothouse and two further albums Heads and Hearts and Thunder Up over the next five years. These were all released on small independent labels, and never reversed the band's diminishing profile.

Although it is unclear as to when Borland was diagnosed with his condition, from 1985 onward the symptoms of his depression became more and more apparent. His problems would manifest themselves in many of the songs on the Sound's final album, Thunder Up, as well as in the schizophrenic layout of the piece; while the initial tracks deal with confronting issues (for example "Acceleration Group", "Barria Alta"), the second half proceeds at an entirely different tangent, becoming either tortuous ("Shot Up And Shut Down"), frenetic ("I Give You Pain") or mournful ("You've Got A Way"). The touring for Thunder Up culminated in disaster for the band when Borland left halfway through a set at Zoetermeer, Netherlands. It would be the last Sound gig. Dudley described the break-up in 2004:

The band continued without Dudley into 1988, but soon collapsed. The Big Takeover lamented that it was "Like an old friend losing a long fight with a disease". Borland would later blame himself for the break-up of the Sound.

After the Sound: 1988–1999

Early solo career

While his former bandmates discontinued their musical careers, Borland moved to the Netherlands in 1988 to found yet another band, after initially going there on holiday and to meet his manager (Rob Acda). Adrian Borland and the Citizens was formed there, taking advantage of the popularity of the Sound on the continent, and the relative inexpense of venues in the Low Countries. Musically, this was a period of unprecedented collaboration for Borland; for instance, he worked (albeit under the pseudonym "Joachim Pimento") with the Honolulu Mountain Daffodils right up until their final release Psychic Hit List Victim in 1991.

In 1989, Adrian Borland and the Citizens released Alexandria, a huge departure musically from Thunder Up and featuring four backing vocalists, bass, cello, clarinet, drums and kettle drums, piano, saxophone, harmonica, tambourine, viola, violin and guitar. Some continuity was provided by former Sound bandmate Colvin 'Max' Mayers collaborating by reprising his role of keyboardist, while Nick Robbins again engineered and co-produced the album with Borland. The album featured much calmer, lighter tracks than those on Thunder Up, such as "Light the Sky" and "Rogue Beauty". As always, some tracks deal with Borland's own precarious emotional state, such as "No Ethereal" and "Deep Deep Blue". In an interview with Melody Maker the same year, Borland said of the title:

The album, however, suffered from poor sales, selling an estimated 10,000 copies on the continent and a mere 1,000 in England. Borland attributed this to poor distribution. Although Borland expressed an interest in re-forming his old band, the Sound never re-formed: bassist Graham Bailey moved to the United States in the early 1990s; keyboardist Max died on Boxing Day 1993 from an AIDs-related illness; and an undisclosed antagonism had caused an irreparable rift between Borland and drummer Mike Dudley. Speaking of a possible reformation in 1992, Borland said:

1992 saw the release of Brittle Heaven, which would later lend its name to the Adrian Borland website. With a menagerie of 14 songs with little difference in style to those of his previous release, the real difference now lay in the composition of the Citizens, which was by now almost exclusively Dutch. Don Victor now co-produced with Borland. The album benefits from lavish investment in production, although this puts it in a similar position to the Sound's Heads and Hearts album in that it is much more polished than Borland's other solo material. Critical reception ranged from the noncommittal to welcoming; AllMusic described it as 'one hour of finely woven tapestry, of gorgeous music', albeit 'Not quite as good as 1989's Alexandria''', handing it three stars out of five, while David Cavanagh gave it four, praising the atmosphere of 'a strange, dizzy optimism' pervading the album. As one critic argued: '[Borland's] reflective writing remains as good as ever', and the Big Takeover went further, proclaiming it 'inspired'.

With some critical endorsement Borland continued to work on new material throughout the year. At some point in 1992 he travelled to Amsterdam to record a session with Victor Heeremans, re-recorded and released many years later as the posthumous The Amsterdam Tapes album. Recorded in a crossover point in his career, it represents a shift in both musical and mental directions: while tracks like "Ordinary Angel" show some continuity with the tone of Brittle Heaven, the forcefulness of tracks such as "Fast Blue World", "Darkest Heart" and "Via Satellite" clearly preclude Borland's later, harder style as seen on 5:00AM and Harmony and Destruction. On the other hand, the acoustic-based fragility of tracks such as "Happen" and "White Room" represents a more immediate turn to lighter, less ambitious music -the latter would be re-recorded to feature on the 1994 album Beautiful Ammunition.

This period also saw Adrian's 1993 collaboration with French-Swiss musician Mark Hunziker at the latter's home studio in London, initially on the basis that Adrian would simply help Hunziker out with some solo recordings. The project became such that the duo largely ended up working on songs and lyrics brought by Adrian. These rock-sounding sessions, which included masterpieces like "Love=Fire" and "Under Your Black Sun" were widely bootlegged and shared among fans until compiled from a variety of sources by Jean-Paul Van Mierlo and properly mastered (by Reinier Rietveld at 2x2 Studios in Rotterdam) for release by Sounds Haarlem Likes Vinyl's "Stichting Opposite Direction" label in 2019 under the title "Lovefield", with a second batch released under the title "Neon and Stone" in 2021. The duo also recruited Mark Wilkin (drums) and Neil Rickarby (bass) for three or four live performances in the London area and came to a sad end after a suicide attempt by Adrian during one of his slumps.

Around this time had also Borland begun working on music production; he produced albums by Felt, Into Paradise and Waiting Sound.

Mid-1990s
In 1994, Borland returned to the UK to record his third album, Beautiful Ammunition, at the Acton Survival Studios on Resolve Records. Whether because of meager investment or because of his desire to explore a more acoustic sound, the new album displayed a simpler format, largely devoid of any discernible concept: "Beautiful Ammunition" is very simply put together, only acoustic guitar, synthesiser and a few drum machines. Everything is very basic, which I like", Borland said later. One notable change from Brittle Heaven is presence of dark, introspective songs, particularly "Lonely Late Nighter" and "White Room", emphasised somewhat by the empty, lonely musical framework. This is not to say, however, that more confident tracks are banished from the album: "Reunited States of Love" and "Someone Will Love You Today" are perfect examples of this, and yet still exemplify in their tentativeness a decisive split from Brittle Heaven-era songs. Critical reception was as muted as always, and mixed where evident; Big Takeover complained that it was 'too light and airy', but vaguely appraised the work as 'finely honed and pleasant'.

The following year, 1995, was to be an important year for Borland; not only was the album Cinematic written and released, but his work with Carlo van Putten, Claudia Uman, Florian Brattman and David Maria Gramse in The White Rose Transmission came to fruition, with the side-project's self-titled debut appearing that year. They would continue to perform intermittently throughout the 1990s, Borland being a major contributor.Cinematic was a stablemate of Beautiful Ammunition in that it was also created in the Survival Studios and under the Resolve label, yet demonstrated a further evolution in Borland's musical career. Despite being in a similar situation as regards funding, Cinematic benefited from much better, integrated production as well as punchy tracks such as "Bright White Light". With the psychological opener "Dreamfuel" a dream-like atmosphere pervaded the album, establishing itself in indolent, moody tracks like "Cinematic" and "When Can I Be Me?". It was, overall, a more coherent attempt than its predecessor, but – predictably – did not win over the public. Critical reception, however, was even more welcoming. With an AllMusic.com ranking of 4 stars the album was lauded:

Simon Heavisides stated: 'Isn't it great when your old favourites don't let you down?...[it] leaves you with the feeling at the end that you want to hear the whole damn thing over again." Mitch Myers wrote in 1997: 'Everybody is a star, but Borland's cinematic life is well worth watching.' Glenn McDonald, however, offered up a less enthusiastic summation: 'The music had an impressive sweep to it, but the production seemed to me to emphasise the mechanical repetitiveness of the arrangements'. The album also lent its name to Cinematic Overview the following year, a compilation album of Borland's work stretching all the way back to the mid seventies.

Also in 1996, the newly formed Renascent Records label reissued Sound records Heads and Hearts (with Shock of Daylight) and In The Hothouse, complete with new packaging, and liner notes by Borland himself.

Later years
Borland's last release during his lifetime was the album 5:00AM. A switch to Earth Records and a slight change of crew – Tim Smith of Cardiacs now co-produced with Borland – were the only ostensible differences between the new work and Cinematic. However, the money invested in the album allowed for much better production, a direct result of which was the recording and inclusion of "Baby Moon", a song which Borland had held onto since 1993 but did not want to waste 'on a lo-fi production'. The songs are generally punchier and more radio-friendly, such as opener "Stray Bullets", "City Speed" and "Redemption's Knees", but containing powerful, dark, indolent tracks which, at this point, Borland had made his solo trademark: "Vampiric" is arguably the best example of this in all of his discography. The album is also representative of earlier work in that it does not fail to neglect his mental state, dealing with it in an optimistic, confrontational fashion in "Over The Under": 'Under this roof, under the sky/I want to live, at least I'm going to try/But I'm over the under now'. That song would prove to be Borland's last single release. The critical reception was, perhaps, the best of any in his lifetime. Glenn McDonald produced the following glowing review:

Borland himself was excited by 5:00AM, and was keen to draw lines between it and his most successful period: '"5:00 A.M" takes up, where "Thunder Up" –
which was the last Sound album – left off...It's still the same person, who writes the songs, only a little bit less in love with himself and more worldview
orientated.".

Before attending to what would become his last solo recordings, Borland wrote twelve of the fourteen tracks on The White Rose Transmission's second release, 700 Miles of Desert, recording them with the band between November 1998 and January 1999 and producing the album himself. Borland was proud of the work, and said so in his last public writing, dated 18 March 1999:

Death
By 1999, Borland had lived with severe depression for about 14 years. He had still been denied commercial success or widespread popularity outside of continental Europe, and he had tried to kill himself at least three times, the third (according to his mother Win Borland) when he jumped in front of a car. He had also developed a drinking problem.

His plans for that year were staggering. Not content with merely anticipating the release of 700 Miles of Desert he expressed the intention to record a sixth solo album with Heads and Hearts producer Wally Brill, a tour of Europe that June to promote the WRT album, a further tour later in the year to promote the new solo release, and 'a 12 song acoustic record with Wally Brill using percussion, trumpet, violin, viola and atmospheric electric guitar' for 2000. Meanwhile the remastering of several the Sound recordings, created at the very start of their career in 1979, was underway by Wally Brill. The finished product, Propaganda, was released by Renascent and featured linernotes by Borland, like all previous releases. It would be officially released on 26 April – the very day Borland would die by suicide. Of the plans drawn up by Borland over the winter, only his solo album was undertaken. It was recorded at The Premises, London over a number of months, although Borland himself recorded guide vocals and guitar in the space of about a fortnight. After this point his disposition changed. In a letter he wrote to his parents shortly before his death he expressed fear at being sectioned in Springfield mental hospital. 'He was returning home distraught and anxious...he had ignored the medical advice to pace himself', his mother, Win Borland, wrote. At evidence given at Westminster Coroner's Court it was revealed that he had visited an ex-girlfriend in the days before his death and that his condition had worsened thereafter. The Wimbledon Guardian reported:

The night of the 25th, Borland slipped away to Wimbledon Station. In the early hours of the 26th, horrified commuters watched as Borland died by throwing himself under a train. He was 41 years of age, and was interred at the Merton & Sutton Joint Cemetery, London. In an account given by drummer Mike Dudley his funeral was attended by his parents, Bob Lawrence and Adrian Janes of The Outsiders, original Sound keyboardist Bi Marshall, early Sound manager Stephen Budd and Wally Brill, co-producer of Heads and Hearts and Harmony and Destruction, among a multitude of others.

Legacy
Although 700 Miles of Desert was released to minimal critical acclaim, Borland's work has enjoyed an appreciative critical reception and a lasting fan base, with sites such as brittleheaven.com and renascent.co.uk providing an online outlet for information and sales. In 2000, a book of anecdotes and memories written by his friends, colleagues and mother was published in English and Dutch, named Book of Happy Memories (after the Brittle Heaven song "Box of Happy Memories"), compiled by Willemien Spook and Jean-Paul van Mierlo. 2001 saw in a tribute album, titled In Passing – A Tribute to Adrian Borland and the Sound, as well as Renascent reissues of Sound albums Jeopardy!, From The Lion's Mouth and All Fall Down . 2002 saw the release of Harmony & Destruction, the remnants of his sixth solo album painstakingly salvaged by Pat Rowles (No Corridor) and audio engineer Pete Barraclough (The Lucy Show, Archive) from the recordings made by Wally Brill at the Premises and four-track demos recorded by Rowels. The BBC recordings of Sound sessions from the 1980s were released with linernotes by Mike Dudley in 2004. 2006 saw The Amsterdam Tapes, a demo album from 1992 that was rejected by his label also remastered and rerecorded by his friends; a band of them grouped together later that year under the moniker 'The Sound of Adrian Borland' to promote it. That same year five live albums, collectively known as The Dutch Radio Recordings, were released by Renascent. These garnered overwhelmingly positive reviews. His collaborative project with Graham Bailey as Second Layer was also resurrected in 2009 by Cherry Red Records; who re-released a remastered version of the 1981 album World of Rubber in the same year.

Mark Burgess' song "Adrian Be" is dedicated to him.

A book of Borland's lyrics, called Adrian Borland & The Sound - Meaning of a Distant Victory, was published in 2016 by Giuseppe Basile and Marcello Nitti.

In 2016, an English-language Dutch documentary about Borland, directed by Marc Waltman, premiered at the IDFA festival in The Netherlands.

Musical style
Influences
Borland's initial influences can be traced through his work with The Outsiders into punk bands of the 70s, such as the Sex Pistols. However, it is clear that he had a broader appreciation for other forms of rock parallel to this; his admiration for The Stooges and Iggy Pop was reaffirmed on several occasions Other influences included The Velvet Underground, Lou Reed, Jim Morrison and Joy Division and David Bowie. In terms of admiration for contemporaries, mid-show interview in 1984, he cited New Order, Soft Cell and Eurythmics. His favourite bands from the eighties were The Waterboys and Talk Talk. He also lauded Ride in the early 1990s.

Popular themes
Borland's earliest lyrics with the Sound showed a tendency toward introspection, even before their music was really influenced by Joy Division. The song "Words Fail Me", was the earliest clear example of this. Many songs simply portray general themes of urban squalor, and political lyrics such as "Cost of Living", "Music Business" and the track "Missiles", which would reach infamy when included on their debut release, Jeopardy!. The songs on Jeopardy! would largely reflect inward tensions rather than political ones: a curious compromise is reached on "Unwritten Law", an attack on religious dogma surrounding suicide: 'A hand is a hand/A knife is a knife/Blood is blood/And life is life'. From The Lion's Mouth would also contain another reference to religion with "Judgement". Political songs would be largely absent from most further releases; only "Golden Soldiers" ("And I will drink to those who sacrifice and die for me/So I could be so golden") and "Shot Up And Shot Down" ("Most of England is sleeping in the sun/But not everyone") suggest political topics. In his solo work there are more stark examples, such as "Beneath The Big Wheel" and "The Other Side of The World" on Alexandria and the quasi-religious song "Station of The Cross" on Beautiful Ammunition. As Borland's condition got worse in the latter half on the 1990s, political themes were dropped as introspective ones once more took precedence.

While Borland denied that music helped him (he claimed it "doesn't make any difference" in an interview in 1992 ), after his death his mother wrote that they were at least a cathartic form of therapy and "helped him to come to terms with his problems". Thus it is that we can frequently infer from the body of work he left what his state of mind may have been at various stages of his life. The Jeopardy! opener "I Can't Escape Myself" would project Borland's dissatisfaction with himself, and serves as an early example of his more depressive lyrics. "Fatal Flaw", from the generally more confident album From The Lion's Mouth explores mental weakness, a theme repeated more frequently on All Fall Down in the schizophrenic "Party of The Mind" and "As Feeling Dies"; on Heads and Hearts the crazed "Whirlpool" and "Burning Part of Me"; on Thunder Up the whole second half of the album. In his solo career songs such as "Deep Deep Blue", "Lonely Late Nighter" and "Stranger in the Soul" parallel Borland's suffering with his condition – by "Harmony & Destruction" it is merely easier to pick out upbeat songs from the multitude of depressed ones.

"Night Versus Day", a song that had also been part of the Propaganda sessions, is an example of Borland's fascination with dichotomy and the themes of light and dark, which were usually used as a metaphor for the polarising effects of his condition. "New Dark Age" and "Winter" both link the night with fear or slowness. The most obvious Sound song with this idea is "You've Got A Way", the closing track on Thunder Up:
"You've got a way/To shoot my night right through with the light of day". It is noteworthy that Borland's first solo single was "Light The Sky", the lyrics of which ae echoed in "Shadow of Your Grace": "You lit up my life and work/It was falling into place". The dichotomy is reversed on the 5:00am track "Vampiric": "Before the dawn draws its first breath/Before the Sun destroys what's left/Of us". The album title should also be noted for being the time that dawn usually rises around the equinox. The theme of night and day is brought in as a central concept on the album Harmony & Destruction: the bright opener is "Solar", for instance, while "Startime" and "Heart Goes Down Like The Sun" are dark-named songs about depression. It may be significant that in "Last Train Out of Shatterville", which may be an act of suicide ideation, describes a train pulling out "in the cold morning light", and describes a previous suicide attempt as happening "last dawn as you slipped from curb to bonnet". The final track "Living on the Edge of God" contains the lyric "Strip me down, expose the man/Not a pretty sight in the morning light".

Discography
Solo albums
 Alexandria (1989), PIAS
 Brittle Heaven (1992), PIAS
 Beautiful Ammunition (1994), Resolve
 Cinematic (1995), Resolve
 5:00 AM (1997), Earth
 The Last Days of the Rain Machine (2000), Red Sun (posthumous)
 Harmony & Destruction (2002), Red Sun (posthumous)
 The Amsterdam Tapes (2006), Pop One (posthumous)
 Beautiful Ammunition (with 3 earlier unreleased songs and inclusive the song "Beautiful Ammunition") (2017), Stichting Opposite Direction/Sounds Haarlem likes Vinyl'
 Lovefield (with 10 earlier unreleased songs (2019), Stichting Opposite Direction/Sounds Haarlem likes Vinyl'
 Cinematic (with 4 earlier unreleased songs (2020), Stichting Opposite Direction/Sounds Haarlem likes Vinyl'
 Lovefield - Neon And Stone (with 4 earlier unreleased songs (2021), Stichting Opposite Direction/Sounds Haarlem likes Vinyl'
 2 Meter sessions (2022) Stichting Opposite Direction/Sounds Haarlem likes Vinyl'
 5:00AM (with 2 earlier unreleased songs (2022), Stichting Opposite Direction/Sounds Haarlem likes Vinyl'
 The Scales Of Love And Hate (2022), Stichting Opposite Direction/Sounds Haarlem likes Vinyl'

Compilation albums
 Vital Years (1993), Gift of Life
 Cinematic Overview (promotional-only) (1995), Setanta
 BBC Recordings (2004), Renascent
 The Dutch Radio Recordings, vol 1–5 (2006), Renascent

Singles and EPs
 Light the Sky (1989), PIAS
 Beneath the Big Wheel (1989), PIAS
 All the Words (1992), PIAS
 Over the Under (1997), Earth

The Outsiders

 Calling on Youth (1977), Raw Edge
 One to Infinity 7-inch EP (1977), Raw Edge
 Close Up (1978), Raw Edge

 with the Sound

 Physical World E.P. 7-inch EP (1979), Tortch
 Jeopardy! (1980), Korova (reissued 2001, Renascent)
 "Heyday" Single (1980), Korova
 Live Instinct Maxi (1981), WEA Records BV
 From the Lions Mouth (1981), Korova (reissued 2001, Renascent)
 "Sense of Purpose" Single (1981), Korova
 "Hot House" Single (1982), Korova
 All Fall Down (1982), WEA Records (reissued 2001, Renascent)
 "Party of the Mind" Single (1982), WEA Records BV
 "Mining dor Heart" Flexi (1983), Vinyl Magazine
 "Counting the Days" Single (1984), Statik
 "Golden Soldiers" Single (1984), Victoria
 Shock of Daylight EP (1984), Statik
 Heads and Hearts (1985), Statik (reissued 1996 with Shock of Daylight, Renascent)
 "Temperature Drop" Single (1985), Statik
 "Under You" Single (1985), Statik
 In the Hothouse (1985), Statik (reissued 1996, Renascent)
 Counting the Days (1986), Statik
 Thunder Up (1987), PIAS
 "Hand of Love" Single (1987), PIAS
 "Iron Years" Single (1987), PIAS
 Propaganda (1999), Renascent (recorded 1979)
 The BBC Recordings (2004)
  Physical World EP reissue (2020), Reminder
 Will And Testament/Starlight (2021), Stichting Opposite Direction/Sounds Haarlem likes Vinyl'

 with the Witch Trials

 The Witch Trials (1981)

 with Second Layer

 Flesh as Property EP (1979), Tortch
 State of Emergency EP (1980), Tortch
 World of Rubber (1981), Cherry Red (reissued 2009, Pop One)
 Second Layer (1987), LD Records

 with Honolulu Mountain Daffodils

 Guitars of the Oceanic Undergrowth (1987)
 Tequila Dementia (1988)
 Aloha Sayonara (1991)
 Psychic Hit-List Victims (1991) (EP)
 "Also sprächt Scott Thurston" (1988) (single)

 with White Rose Transmission

 White Rose Transmission (1995), Strange Music
 700 Miles of Desert'' (1999), Fuego

References

External links
 https://www.adrianborlandthesound.com/

1957 births
1999 suicides
British post-punk musicians
English punk rock guitarists
English male guitarists
English male singers
English new wave musicians
English songwriters
English record producers
Musicians from London
Suicides by train
Suicides in Wimbledon
20th-century English singers
20th-century British guitarists
People with schizoaffective disorder
20th-century British male singers
1999 deaths
20th-century British businesspeople
British male songwriters
Setanta Records artists